The Rally Liepāja is an international rally racing event that travels northwards along the coastline of the Baltic Sea from Liepāja to Ventspils in Latvia. The event is a round of the European Rally Championship and the Latvian Rally Championship.

History
The rally was run for the first time in 2013 as the first international auto racing event to be held in Latvia since gaining independence from the Soviet Union in 1991 and just the second motorsport event after the motorcycle Speedway Grand Prix of Latvia.

Originally the rally was designed as a snow rally and unlike its neighbour in the ERC calendar, the Jänner Rallye, was not a tarmac based event but a traditional snow rally similar to events like Rally Sweden.The inaugural event was won by Finnish driver Jari Ketomaa driving a Ford Fiesta RRC in a one-off appearance for the British Autotek Motorsport team in the European Rally Championship.

In 2016 the rally was moved to a September date, becoming a gravel rally, before settling into October in 2017.

Winners
Sourced from:

References

External links

European Rally Championship
Rally Liepāja at eWRC-results

 
Liepaja
Rally competitions in Latvia
Recurring sporting events established in 2013
Liepaja